Wágner Canotilho or simply Wágner (born 29 March 1945) is a Brazilian football manager and a former player. He also holds Portuguese citizenship.

He played 14 seasons and 318 games in the Primeira Liga for Vitória de Setúbal, Leixões and Sporting.

Club career
He made his Primeira Liga debut for Leixões on 27 October 1963 in a game against Porto.

Honours

Sporting
Primeira Liga champion: 1973–74.
Taça de Portugal winner: 1972–73, 1973–74.
Torneio de Atenas: 1974
Torneio de Sevilha: 1974
Mini copa do mundo ( Caracas - Venezuela ) 1970
Troféu Teresa Herrera: 1969
Troféu Iberico: 1968

References

1945 births
Footballers from São Paulo
Living people
Brazilian footballers
Clube Atlético Juventus players
Leixões S.C. players
Primeira Liga players
Associação Portuguesa de Desportos players
Vitória F.C. players
Sporting CP footballers
Association football midfielders
Brazilian football managers
União Montemor managers